West Point is a 1927 American silent romantic drama film starring William Haines and Joan Crawford in a story about an arrogant cadet who finds love right before the all-important Army–Navy Game.

The story and screenplay were written by Raymond L. Schrock with titles written by Joseph Farnham. The film was directed by Edward Sedgwick.

Plot
Arrogant and wise-cracking Brice Wayne (William Haines) enrolls at the United States Military Academy at West Point and adjusts to life as a plebe. He tries out for the plebe football team, where he excels and shows up the varsity team.  However, his ego is unrivaled, especially in competition with upperclassman Bob Sperry (Neil Neely).  At the same time, Brice meets a local girl named Betty Channing (Joan Crawford) who cheers for him at football practices.

A year later, Brice is the star football player for West Point.  By this time, both Sperry and Brice are in love with Betty, and while Sperry acts like a gentleman towards Betty, Brice forces a kiss on Betty, only for her to spurn him.  Betty continues to reject Brice's advances.

When he is benched for his attitude, Brice decries favoritism by Coach Towers (Raymond G. Moses) to the local paper.  After an altercation with the coach in the locker room, Brice shouts "to hell with the Corps" and quits the team in a huff.  This causes a scandal among the cadets, who move to have the Cadet Honor Committee "Silence" Brice.

Brice's roommate Tex McNeil (William Bakewell) tries to reason with him but the angered Brice hits him.  Immediately regretting his actions, Brice tries to help. After Brice leaves to contemplate his actions in private, Tex accidentally falls down a flight of stairs. Despite this he pleads with the Honor Committee not to censure Brice—before collapsing with a serious concussion.

Brice writes a letter of resignation from West Point out of shame, but regrets his action when he realizes he needs to help the team. As the train carrying the team to the Army-Navy Game is about to leave, Brice is called before the superintendent. When he indicates both his contrition and an understanding of the "spirit of the Corps," the superintendent hands him back his resignation.

Brice apologizes to the coach for his behavior but is still benched. In the 4th quarter, with Army down, a player is injured and Brice is sent in. Despite an injured arm he scores a touchdown that wins the game for Army, and asks for forgiveness from his team.

As graduation from West Point concludes some years later, he ends in the arms of Betty while enthusiastically observing the traditions of the Corps.

Cast
William Haines as Brice Wayne
Joan Crawford as Betty Channing
William Bakewell as 'Tex' McNeil
Neil Neely as Bob Sperry
Ralph Emerson as Bob Chase
Leon Kellar as Capt. Munson
Raymond G. Moses as Coach Towers (*billed Major Raymond G. Moses U.S.A.)

Production notes
The film was shot on location at West Point, New York.

The same story used for this film was used for the DeMille Company's 1927 movie Dress Parade with William Boyd and Bessie Love.

The assistant director was Edward Brophy, who would soon switch to acting full-time.

Reception

Photoplay commented, "Bill Haines' starring vehicle...treats everything in a humorous vein in the beginning, getting many laughs."

References

External links
 
 
 

1927 films
1927 romantic drama films
American black-and-white films
American football films
American romantic drama films
American silent feature films
Films directed by Edward Sedgwick
Films set in the United States Military Academy
Films shot in New York (state)
Metro-Goldwyn-Mayer films
Silent romantic drama films
1920s American films
Silent American drama films